Izetta is a female given name. Notable people with the name include:

Izetta Jewel (1883–1978), American actress, suffragist, and political candidate
Izetta Roberts Cooper (born 1929), Liberian librarian and writer
Izetta Sombo Wesley,  head of the Liberia Football Association

Feminine given names